ECF may refer to:

Science, technology and medicine 
 East Coast fever or theileriosis, a disease of cattle in Africa
 Electrochemical fluorination
 Elemental chlorine free, a form of paper bleaching
 Enterocutaneous fistula
 Evolving classification function
 Extracellular fluid
 Eye-controlled focusing
 ECF, a chemotherapy regimen

Sport 
 English Chess Federation
 European Curling Federation

Sustainable development 
 European Climate Foundation
 European Climate Forum
 European Cyclists' Federation

Other uses 
 Eighteenth-Century Fiction, an academic journal
 Electronic court filing
 Enterprise Capital Fund, in the United Kingdom
 European Cultural Foundation
 Economic Cooperation Foundation, in Israel
 Evangelize China Fellowship